Shigeto Dam is a dam in Kōchi Prefecture, Japan.

Dams in Kōchi Prefecture